The decade of the 1780s in archaeology involved some significant events.

Explorations

 1786: Antonio Bernasconi and Colonel Antonio del Rio examine the ruins of Palenque, making the first map of the site and some crude excavations.

Excavations
 1786: Excavation of a Roman villa near Warminster in England by antiquarian Catherine Downes.
 1788: Excavations of Roman city of Viroconium Cornoviorum (Wroxeter) in England by civil engineer Thomas Telford.
 Formal excavations continue at Pompeii.

Finds
 1780
 Tomb of the Scipios rediscovered in Rome.
 Discobolus Palombara discovered in Rome.
 1781: Roman coin hoards found in England near Eye, Suffolk (approximate date) and Stanmore, near London.
 1782: Tomb of Catherine Parr (d. 1548) rediscovered in Sudeley Castle, England.
 1786: Gold thumb ring of Senicianus discovered near Calleva Atrebatum (Silchester) in England.
 1789: The Stony Stratford Hoard uncovered in England.
 Xagħra Stone Circle first discovered in Malta.

Publications
 1785: Engineer Diego Ruiz visits and publishes the first account of El Tajín.
 1789: Saggio di lingua Etrusca by Luigi Lanzi.

Other events
 1780: December 18 - The Society of Antiquaries of Scotland is formed.
 1783: The Society of Antiquaries of Scotland is incorporated.

Births
 1784: July 25 - Richard William Howard Vyse, English soldier, anthropologist and Egyptologist (d. 1853).
 1785: November 24 - Philipp August Böckh, German classical scholar and antiquarian (d. 1867).
 1786: December 11 - William John Bankes, English Member of Parliament, explorer and Egyptologist (d. 1855).
 1787: March 28 - Claudius James Rich, English traveller and scholar (d. 1820).
 1788: September 10 - Jacques Boucher de Crèvecœur de Perthes, French archaeologist (d. 1868)
 1788: December 29 - Christian Jürgensen Thomsen, Danish archaeologist (d. 1865).

Deaths
 1788: James Stuart, Scottish archaeologist (b. 1713)

References

Archaeology by decade
Archaeology